The Icelandic Men's Basketball League Cup is a basketball competition between clubs in Iceland run by the Icelandic Basketball Association.

History and format
The League Cup was founded in 2020 by the Icelandic Basketball Association. The Cup is split in upper and lower part. In the upper part, the top 16 teams from the top-tier Úrvalsdeild karla and the second-tier 1. deild karla. All the rounds are played with a single game knockout format. The 8 teams that get knocked out in the 16-team stage will then play in the lower part of the cup.

The first games are scheduled to start on 27 August 2020 with the final being played on 12 September 2020.

See also
Icelandic Basketball Federation
Úrvalsdeild karla
Icelandic Basketball Cup
Icelandic Basketball Supercup
Icelandic Division I

References

External links
 Icelandic Basketball Federation 

2020 establishments in Iceland
Men
Basketball cup competitions in Europe
Recurring sporting events established in 2020